The Offence is a 1973 British crime neo noir drama film directed by Sidney Lumet, based upon the 1968 stage play This Story of Yours by John Hopkins. It stars Sean Connery as police detective Johnson, who kills suspected child molester Kenneth Baxter (Ian Bannen) while interrogating him. The film explores Johnson's varied, often aggressive attempts at rationalizing what he did, revealing his true motives for killing the suspect in a series of flashbacks. Trevor Howard and Vivien Merchant appear in major supporting roles. Bannen was nominated for a BAFTA award for his performance.

Plot 
Detective-Sergeant Johnson has been a police officer for 20 years and is deeply affected by the murders, rapes, and other violent crimes he has investigated. He is plagued by images of violence,  and he appears to be losing his mind under the strain.

His anger surfaces while interrogating Kenneth Baxter, who is suspected of raping a young girl. By the end of the interrogation, Johnson has severely beaten Baxter, who is then taken to the hospital where he later dies.

Johnson is suspended for the beating and returns home for the night, getting into a violent argument with his wife Maureen. Two of Johnson's colleagues come to inform him of Baxter's death and they take him to the police station for questioning.

The following day, Johnson is interviewed by Detective Superintendent Cartwright. During their long confrontation, flashbacks show the events of the previous night, when Johnson beat Baxter.

The flashbacks portray Baxter  — whose guilt or innocence is left ambiguous — taunting Johnson, insinuating that Johnson secretly wants to commit the sort of sex crimes that he investigates. Johnson at first flies into a rage and strikes Baxter, but he eventually admits that he does indeed harbour obsessive fantasies of murder and rape. He then tearfully begs Baxter to help him. When Baxter recoils from him in disgust, Johnson brutally beats him while Baxter continues to taunt and laugh at him.

The film ends with another flashback, this time of Johnson attacking the police officers who pulled him off Baxter, and muttering "God...my God..." as he realises what he has done.

Cast
Sean Connery - Johnson
Trevor Howard - Cartwright
Vivien Merchant - Maureen
Ian Bannen - Baxter
Peter Bowles - Cameron
Derek Newark - Jessard
Ronald Radd - Lawson
John Hallam - Panton
Richard Moore - Garrett
Anthony Sagar - Hill
Maxine Gordon - Janie
Hilda Fenemore - woman on common  
Rhoda Lewis - woman at school  
Cynthia Lund - child at school  
Howard Goorney - Lambert

Production

When Connery agreed to return as James Bond in Diamonds Are Forever, David V. Picker, CEO of United Artists, pledged to back two of Connery's own film projects, provided they cost $2 million or less, in association with Connery's own production company, Tantallon Films.  The Offence, made under the working title Something Like the Truth (a line that appears in John Hopkins' original play), was the first. Connery was keen to shake off the image of James Bond and expand his range as an actor.

Connery had previously worked with Hopkins when the writer had co-scripted Thunderball and had seen the play during its original run in London in 1968. Seeing potential in the story, Connery bought the option on the film rights and asked Hopkins to adapt the script for the big screen.

Having made two films with Sidney Lumet, The Hill  and The Anderson Tapes, Connery appreciated his straightforward approach and offered him the job of directing. Lumet was keen to work with Connery again and accepted. Ian Bannen, who had also appeared in The Hill, was hired as co-star.

The film was shot on a small budget of £385,000 in March and April 1972 in and around Bracknell, Berkshire—notably the Wildridings Mill Pond area and Easthampstead's Point Royal. Interior sets were filmed at Twickenham Studios. A collection of location stills and corresponding contemporary photographs is hosted at reelstreets.com.

The fight sequences between Connery and Bannen were choreographed, uncredited, by Bob Simmons, who had designed similar action scenes for the Bond films. The film was Sir Harrison Birtwistle's only film score.

United Artists released The Offence early in 1973. It was a critical success but a commercial failure and did not yield a profit for nine years, even going unreleased in several markets, including France, where it did not premiere until 2007. Due to the commercial failure of the film, United Artists opted out of the two-film financing deal they made with Connery and his production company.

Reception

Home media
In 2004, MGM UK released a DVD of the film which contained no extras or trailers. Simultaneous releases from MGM were made in other PAL format countries, such as Germany and Australia. On 20 October 2008, the film was again released on DVD in the UK by Optimum Releasing, again without extras or trailers. A French Region 2 DVD, preserving the film's original ratio of 1:1.66, became available in 2009. In April 2010, MGM put the film out on a U.S. DVD-R "on demand" for the first time. It is available as an exclusive from Amazon.com and contains no extras.

In 2014 the film was released on Blu-ray in the US, and in 2015 it was released in the UK in the same format.

This Story of Yours
John Hopkins' original play, This Story of Yours, takes the form of three dialogues between Johnson and, in Act One, Maureen, then Cartwright in Act Two and Baxter in Act Three. Directed by Christopher Morahan, it opened at London's Royal Court Theatre on 11 December 1968. The cast was as follows:

Johnson – Michael Bryant
Maureen – Alethea Charlton
Cartwright – John Phillips
Baxter – Gordon Jackson
Policemen – Edward Clayton, Steven Barnes, Oliver Maguire, Colin Pinney

The first major revival of the play was directed by Jack Gold at London's Hampstead Theatre, opening on 5 February 1987 with the following cast:

Johnson – David Suchet
Maureen – Jane Wood
Cartwright – Bryan Pringle
Baxter – James Hazeldine
Det Sgt Jessard – Richard Cubison
Police Constables – Paul Fryer, Frederick Lane

References

External links

 
 
 Original theatrical trailer for The Offence

1973 films
1973 crime drama films
British police films
British crime drama films
1970s English-language films
British films based on plays
United Artists films
Films directed by Sidney Lumet
Films about child sexual abuse
Films about rape
Films with screenplays by John Hopkins
1970s British films
Films about police brutality

ru:Оскорбление